Letter to Evan is a live album by jazz pianist Bill Evans with Marc Johnson and Joe LaBarbera recorded at Ronnie Scott's Jazz Club in 1980 about two months before his death. It was released on the Dreyfus Jazz label.

Reception
The Allmusic review by Scott Yanow awarded the album 4 stars and states "Evans is heard with one of his finest trios... in surprisingly enthusiastic and creative form; there is no hint that the end is near... Easily recommended for true Bill Evans fans".

Track listing
All compositions by Bill Evans except as indicated
 "Emily" (Johnny Mandel, Johnny Mercer) - 5:33
 "Days of Wine and Roses" (Henry Mancini, Mercer) - 8:25
 "Knit for Mary F." - 6:07
 "Like Someone in Love" (Johnny Burke, Jimmy Van Heusen) - 7:06
 "Your Story" - 3:56
 "Stella by Starlight" (Ned Washington, Victor Young) - 8:26
 "My Man's Gone Now" (George Gershwin, Ira Gershwin, DuBose Heyward) - 6:07
 "Letter to Evan" - 8:03
Recorded at Ronnie Scott's Jazz Club in London, England on July 21, 1980

Personnel
Bill Evans - piano
Marc Johnson - bass
Joe LaBarbera - drums

References

Bill Evans live albums
1980 live albums
Albums recorded at Ronnie Scott's Jazz Club